Carposina ekbatana is a moth in the Carposinidae family. It was described by Hans Georg Amsel in 1978. It is found in Iran.

References

Natural History Museum Lepidoptera generic names catalog

Carposinidae
Moths described in 1978
Moths of Asia